Lu Lu (born 29 September 1990) is a retired Chinese female badminton player. In 2008, she won gold medal in the mixed team event at the World Junior Championships. In the individual event, she won mixed doubles silver and girls' doubles bronze. She also competed at the Asian Junior Championships, and won the girls' doubles silver medal, and gold medals in the mixed team and doubles event. Partnered with Zhang Nan, Lu became the champion at the 2009 Philippines Open. In 2010, she became the women's doubles runner-up at the China Masters Super Series tournament with Bao Yixin.

Achievements

BWF World Junior Championships 
Girls' doubles

Mixed doubles

Asian Junior Championships 
Girls' doubles

Mixed doubles

BWF Superseries 
The BWF Superseries, launched on 14 December 2006 and implemented in 2007, is a series of elite badminton tournaments, sanctioned by Badminton World Federation (BWF). BWF Superseries has two level such as Superseries and Superseries Premier. A season of Superseries features twelve tournaments around the world, which introduced since 2011, with successful players invited to the Superseries Finals held at the year end.

Women's doubles

  BWF Superseries Finals tournament
  BWF Superseries Premier tournament
  BWF Superseries tournament

BWF Grand Prix 
The BWF Grand Prix has two levels: Grand Prix and Grand Prix Gold. It is a series of badminton tournaments, sanctioned by Badminton World Federation (BWF) since 2007.

Mixed doubles

  BWF Grand Prix Gold tournament
  BWF Grand Prix tournament

References 

Living people
1990 births
People from Nanning
Badminton players from Guangxi
Chinese female badminton players
21st-century Chinese women